The 1998 Asian Junior Men's Volleyball Championship was held in Azadi Volleyball Hall, Tehran, Iran from 8 October to 15 October 1998.

Pools composition
The teams are seeded based on their final ranking at the 1996 Asian Junior Men's Volleyball Championship.

Preliminary round

Pool A

|}

|}

Pool B

|}

|}

Final round
 The results and the points of the matches between the same teams that were already played during the preliminary round shall be taken into account for the final round.

Classification 9th–12th

|}

|}

Classification 5th–8th

|}

|}

Championship

|}

|}

Final standing

Team Roster
Behnam Mahmoudi, Mohammad Torkashvand, Mohammad Shariati, Alireza Nadi, Alireza Behboudi, Afshin Oliaei, Morteza Shiari, Amir Ahmadi, Hossein Moghaddamrad, Aghmohammad Salagh, Mehrdad Soltani, Farhad Kaveh-Ahangaran
Head Coach: Mostafa Karkhaneh

Awards
MVP:  Alireza Nadi
Best Scorer:  Behnam Mahmoudi
Best Spiker:  Mohammad Torkashvand
Best Blocker:  Liu Yuyi
Best Server:  Behnam Mahmoudi
Best Setter:  Mohammad Shariati

External links
 www.jva.or.jp

A
V
V
Asian men's volleyball championships
Asian Junior